Pradip Purohit is an Indian politician. He was elected to the Odisha Legislative Assembly from Padampur in the 2014 Odisha Legislative Assembly election as a member of the Bharatiya Janata PartyHe has started his social life from the "BALCO Hatao Gandhamardan bachao" andolan.He was the founder and coordinator of this andolan,later thousands of peoples from every villages of Padampur sub-division joined him and he became a public figure.

References

Living people
Members of the Odisha Legislative Assembly
People from Bargarh district
Bharatiya Janata Party politicians from Odisha
Year of birth missing (living people)